Dolgener See is a lake in the Mecklenburgische Seenplatte district in Mecklenburg-Vorpommern, Germany. At an elevation of 97.8 m, its surface area is 0.69 km².

Mecklenburgische Seenplatte (district)
LDolgenerSee